The Garden of Silence is a meditative space at the end of Sukhna Lake, Chandigarh, India. It features a seated Buddha. The garden is financed by the Ministry of Tourism and developed by the Chandigarh Administration.

References

Monuments and memorials in India
Parks in Chandigarh
Ministry of Tourism (India)